Bret Maverick: Faith, Hope, and Clarity starring James Garner is a two-part episode of the 1981-82 television series Bret Maverick edited together and released to local television stations as a TV movie. The show involves a religious cult that swindles the townspeople out of a tract of land. Maverick winds up straightening everything out. The episodes were directed by Leo Penn (father of Sean Penn) and the film is sometimes entitled simply Bret Maverick. The same thing was done with the two-hour series premiere, slightly condensed and marketed to television stations as Bret Maverick: The Lazy Ace.  The Bret Maverick television series was a sequel to the 1957 series Maverick, created by Roy Huggins, in which Garner had played the same character two decades earlier.

Cast

 James Garner as Bret Maverick
 Ed Bruce as Tom Guthrie
 Ramon Bieri as Elijah Crow
 Richard Hamilton	as Cy Whittaker
 David Knell as Rodney Catlow
 Darleen Carr as Mary Lou Springer
 Robert Webber as Everest Sinclair
 Marj Dusay as Kate Hanranhan
 James Staley as Brother Samuel Workman
 Simone Griffeth as Jasmine DuBois
 Tony Burton as Arthur
 Priscilla Morrill as Estelle Springer
 Richard Libertini as Fingers Wachefsky
 Jameson Parker as Whitney Delaworth III
 Stuart Margolin as Philo Sandeen

See also

 Bret Maverick: The Lazy Ace
 Duel at Sundown (Maverick)
 Shady Deal at Sunny Acres

External links
Bret Maverick: Faith, Hope, and Clarity at the Internet Movie Database

1982 American television episodes
Maverick (TV series)
Fiction about cults